Proto-oncogene protein Wnt-3 is a protein that in humans is encoded by the WNT3 gene.

The WNT gene family consists of structurally related genes that encode secreted signaling proteins. These proteins have been implicated in oncogenesis and in several developmental processes, including regulation of cell fate and patterning during embryogenesis. This gene is a member of the WNT gene family. It encodes a protein showing 98% amino acid identity to mouse Wnt3 protein, and 84% to human WNT3A protein, another WNT gene product. The mouse studies show the requirement of Wnt3 in primary axis formation in the mouse. Studies of the gene expression suggest that this gene may play a key role in some cases of human breast, rectal, lung, and gastric cancer through activation of the WNT-beta-catenin-TCF signaling pathway. This gene is clustered with WNT15, another family member, in the chromosome 17q21 region.

References

External links
  GeneReviews/NIH/NCBI/UW entry on Tetra-Amelia Syndrome

Further reading